Amberg is a town in Bavaria, Germany. It is located in the Upper Palatinate, roughly halfway between Regensburg and Bayreuth. In 2020, over 42,000 people lived in the town.

History 

The town was first mentioned in 1034, at that time under the name Ammenberg. It became an important trading centre in the Middle Ages, exporting mainly iron ore and iron products. In 1269, together with Bamberg, the town became subordinate to the Wittelsbach dynasty that ruled Bavaria.

In 1329 the town and the entire region fell to the Palatinate branch of the Wittelsbach family. The region adopted the name Upper Palatinate. It was no longer part of the duchy of Bavaria politically, though in geographic terms it was regarded as Bavarian and the region was part of the Bavarian circle in the organization of the Imperial Circles. In the 16th century, the rulers of Upper Palatinate turned to Protestantism. The town turned to Lutheranism. Later attempts of the ruling family to introduce the more radical Calvinism failed due to the reluctance of its citizens. In 1628 Amberg and Upper Palatinate became part of the electorate of Bavaria. The inhabitants were given the choice to return to Catholicism or emigrate. Many families left the town and moved to the Free Imperial Cities of Regensburg and Nuremberg.

On 24 August 1796, during the French Revolutionary Wars, the city and its environs were the locale of a major battle at which 35,000 French, under the command of Jean Baptiste Jourdan fought with 40,000 Austrians under the command of Archduke Charles; the French suffered significantly more losses in this Austrian victory. Amberg was the regional capital of Upper Palatinate until 1810 when power was transferred to the larger city of Regensburg.

After World War II, when Bavaria fell into the American Sector, Amberg was home to Pond Barracks, a United States Army post. I.F.Stone writes about it in his book Underground to Palestine (pp. 31ff). The post was closed in 1992 and the facility turned over to the local community for housing, most of it for social housing.

In late 2018, the town was the site of the Amberg attacks, resulting in Rainer Wendt asking the Federal government to take a stand on the case. The city was said to be "in a state of emergency."  Joachim Herrmann, Bavarian Minister of the Interior, visited Amberg for consultations. Horst Seehofer, Federal Minister of the Interior, said "the violent attacks are worrisome."

Jewish history 
Jews had settled in Amberg before 1294, when the first documentation can be found. Shortly after, in 1298, thirteen of the town Jews died during the Rindfleisch massacres. Nevertheless, in 1347 six families received permission to settle in Amberg and twenty years after, in 1367, a Yeshivah was opened in it, though the Jewish community was expelled from Amberg in 1403. Upon the expulsion, the synagogue was annexed to the nearby church. Twelve Jews remained in town in 1942. The few survivors returned to the town after 1945, and a displaced persons camp named Amberg - located nearby the town - housed mostly Jewish refugees and survivors. As a result of immigration from the former USSR to Germany, the Jewish population in town grew to about 275 in 2003. A synagogue exists in town nowadays.

Subdistricts 
Amberg has 25 sub-districts, which include its surrounding villages:

 Amberg
 Atzlricht
 Bergsteig
 Bernricht
 Eglsee
 Fiederhof
 Fuchsstein
 Gailoh
 Gewerbegebiet-Gailoh
 Gewerbegebiet-West
 Gärbershof
 Karmensölden
 Kemnathermühl
 Kleinraigering
 Krumbach
 Lengenloh
 Luitpoldhöhe
 Neubernricht
 Neumühle
 Neuricht
 Oberammersricht
 Raigering
 Schäflohe
 Schweighof
 Speckmannshof
 Unterammersricht

Lord mayors
 1866–1892: Vincent König
 1892–1907: Josef Heldmann
 1907–1913: Georg Schön
 1913–1933: Eduard Klug, BVP
 1933: Otto Saugel (temporary)
 1933–1945: Josef Filbig, NSDAP
 1945–1946: Christian Endemann, SPD
 1946: Eduard Klug
 1946: Christian Endemann, SPD 
 1946–1952: Michael Lotter, CSU
 1952–1958: Josef Filbig, Deutsche Gemeinschaft (Deutschland) 
 1958–1970: Wolf Steininger, CSU
 1970–1990: Franz Prechtl, CSU
 1990–2014: Wolfgang Dandorfer, CSU
 since 2014: Michael Cerny, CSU

Population development

Sights 
A defining feature of the town is the Stadtbrille (literally: town spectacles) – a bridge, originally a part of the town fortifications, whose arches reflected on the river waters resemble a pair of spectacles.

Other tourist attractions in Amberg include:

 Market Square, which contains the Gothic town hall (built in 1358) and the late-Gothic parish church of St. Martin
 The New Palace, the former residence of the counts of the Rhenish Palatinate, built at the beginning of the 15th century and renovated in 1603

 A well-preserved section of the medieval walls and gates
 The baroque Franciscan monastery on the Hill of Our Lady Help of Christians (Germ. Mariahilfberg) above the town. This hill was given its name during the bubonic plague in the Thirty Years' War in 1633/4 when the locals beseeched the Virgin Mary to rid them of the plague.
 The 'Little Wedding House' (local German dialect Eh’häusl), claimed by town authorities to be the world's smallest hotel. Built in 1728, the 2 metre wide hotel was 'sold' to young couples for one night to circumvent laws prohibiting marriages between poor people.
 The town museum (Stadtmuseum Amberg) includes exhibits on life and industry in Amberg, the history of clothing and works of Michael Mathias Prechtl and houses travelling exhibitions.
 Air Museum (Luftmuseum), opened in 2006.

Twin towns – sister cities

Amberg is twinned with:

 Bad Bergzabern, Germany
 Bystrzyca Kłodzka, Poland
 Desenzano del Garda, Italy
 Périgueux, France
 Trikala, Greece
 Ústí nad Orlicí, Czech Republic

Notable people 
 Karl Addicks (born 1950), politician (FDP), Member of Bundestag 2004-2009
 Hans Aumeier (1906–1948), Nazi SS officer in a leading position in several concentration camps executed for war crimes
 Hans Baumann (1914–1988), elementary school teacher, poet, song composer, Children's Book Author, Nazi official
 Alexander Bugera (born 1978), football player
 Sara Däbritz (born 1995), German football player (Bayern Munich, German national team)
 Daniel Ernemann (born 1976), football player
 Heiner Fleischmann (1914–1963), motorcycle racer (mainly on NSU)
 Fritz Hilpert (born 1956), musician (Kraftwerk)
 Theodor Kaes (1852–1913), German neurologist, was a native of Amberg
 Barbara Meier (born 1986), German fashion model
 Franz Stigler (1915–2008), German World War II Luftwaffe fighter ace, 45 aerial victories, member of Jagdgeschwader 27, and Jagdverband 44. Known best for Charlie Brown and Franz Stigler incident.
 Kathrine Switzer (born 1947), first woman to run the Boston Marathon, was born to American parents in Amberg

Sport 
 FC Amberg, football team

References

External links